Clerodendrum infortunatum, known as bhat or hill glory bower, is a perennial shrub belonging to the family Lamiaceae, also sometimes classified under Verbenaceae. It is the type species among ~150 species of Clerodendrum. It is one of the most well-known natural health remedies in traditional practices and siddha medicine.

The species is native to tropical regions of Asia including Bangladesh, India, Myanmar, Pakistan, Thailand, Malaysia, the Andaman Islands, and Sri Lanka.

Description

 
Clerodendrum infortunatum is a flowering shrub or small tree, and is so named because of its rather ugly leaf. Fruit berry, globose, turned bluish-black or black when ripe, enclosed in the red accrescent fruiting-calyx.

Fruit usually with four dry nutlets and the seeds may be with or without endosperm. It flowers from April to August.

Chemical constituents
The major compounds are sterols, sugars, flavonoids and saponins. Novel crystalline compounds such as clerodolone, clerodol, and a sterol designated clerosterol have been isolated from the root. Seven sugars namely raffinose, lactose, maltose, sucrose, galactose, glucose and fructose were identified. Fumaric acid, caffeic acid esters, β-sitosterol and β-sitosterol glucoside were isolated from the flowers. Apigenin, acacetin and a new flavone glycoside, characterised as the methyl ester of acacetin-7-0-glucuronide are isolated from the flowers. Saponin is one of the major compounds of the leaf. 24 beta-ethylsterols, clerosterol and 22-dehydroclerosterol, 24-methyl-sterols (24-methylcholestanol, 24-methylcholesterol, 24-methyl-22-dehydrocholesterol, and 24-methyllathostero) and 24 beta-ethyl-22-dehydrocholestanol are found in the seeds. Scutellarin and hispidulin-7-O-glucuronide are present in the leaf. Poriferasterol and stigmasterol are the components of the aerial parts.

Traditional herbal medicine
Clerodendrum infortunatum is used in Ayurvedic and Siddha traditional medicines.  Fresh leaves are given for diarrhea, liver disorders, and headache.  The leaf and root are used as antidandruff, antipyretic, ascaricide, laxative, vermifuge, anticonvulsant, antidiabetic, and for gravel, malaria, scabies, skin diseases, sores, spasm, scorpion sting, snake bite, and tumors. In many traditional practices the leaves and root are widely used as antihyperglycemic.

References

External links

The Linnean Collection
Clerodendrum viscosum Vent. - VERBENACEAE
Indian Medicinal Plants Growers' Consortium
Cybernome
Tropicos
Flowers of India

infortunatum
Medicinal plants of Asia
Pharmacognosy
Flora of Asia
Plants described in 1753
Siddha medicine
Taxa named by Carl Linnaeus